Robert Owen Antoniuk (born August 26, 2002) is a Canadian soccer player.

Early life 
Antoniuk began playing soccer at age five with the Rosedale Community Association. Afterwards, he played with Calgary Blizzard SC and Calgary Foothills SC. He then joined the Whitecaps FC Alberta Academy Centre, before moving to the official Whitecaps FC Academy in 2018. In 2021, he joined the Vancouver Whitecaps FC U-23, while also getting the opportunity to train with the first team.

Club career
In March 2022, he signed a professional contract with Whitecaps FC 2 in MLS Next Pro. He made his professional debut on March 26, against Houston Dynamo 2. He scored his first goals on April 10, when he scored two goals against Portland Timbers 2, converting a penalty kick in the 75th minute, before scoring a 95th minute equalizer.

In July 2022, he was loaned to Atlético Ottawa of the Canadian Premier League. After the season, Whitecaps 2 declined his club option for 2023.

International career
In 2014, he represented Canada at the U12 Danone Nations Cup.

In 2017, he was selected to join a training camp for the Canada U15 team. In May 2017, he attended the Canada Soccer U15 Showcase.

Honours

Atlético Ottawa 
 Canadian Premier League
Regular Season: 2022

References

External links
 

2002 births
Living people
Association football midfielders
Canadian soccer players
Soccer players from Calgary
Calgary Foothills FC players
Vancouver Whitecaps Residency players
Whitecaps FC 2 players
Atlético Ottawa players
MLS Next Pro players
Canadian Premier League players